The 2014 Intrust Super Cup was the PNG Hunters first season in the Queensland Cup.

Season Summary
On 12 December 2013 head coach Michael Marum announced a 25-man squad for the Hunters' inaugural season. included were Israel Eliab, Roger Laka, Enoch Maki, Mark Mexico, Joe Bruno and Sebastian Pandia who were all members of the Kumuls squad that competed at the 2013 Rugby League World Cup. The squad was impacted when Mark Mexico signed with the Cronulla Sharks in Australia.

The Hunters won their debut match away at Redcliffe Dolphins 24-18 with captain Israel Eliab scoring the club's first ever try, and by the end of the season having lost only twice at home, missed out on the end of season play-offs by just 1 point finishing 6th. Garry Lo finished as the competition's leading try scorer with 24, while Roger Laka was ever present. The club used only 23 players during the whole season.

2014 squad

Squad movement

Gains

Losses

References

2014 in Papua New Guinea rugby league
2014 in rugby league by club
Papua New Guinea Hunters